The Tanglewood International Tennis Classic was a men's tennis tournament played at Tanglewood Park in Clemmons, North Carolina in the United States from 1971 through 1973. The event was part of the Grand Prix tennis circuit and was played on outdoor clay courts.

Finals

Singles

Doubles

External links
 ATP results archive

Defunct tennis tournaments in the United States
Grand Prix tennis circuit